Church Mission Society Boys Higher Secondary School (CMSHSS) is a higher secondary school located in Thrissur city, of Kerala state, in India. The school was started by CMS missionary in 1845. CMS Boys HSS, Thrissur is one of the oldest school in the state of Kerala. The school gives instruction in Malayalam and English and follows the Kerala state syllabus. It has classes from LKG to 12th (+2) standard.

History 
The Church Mission Society started their activities in thrissur in the year 1836. Subsequently they started a lower primary school at mission quarters in East Fort Thrissur on 1845 by Reverend father Henry Harley and he was the missioner of CMS. The current school started in 1883. It is located in the heart of the city (Thrissur Swaraj Round). CMS Boys School is the first Government Aided School in thrissur city and one of the oldest school in kerala.

About
The school gives instruction in Malayalam and English and follows the Kerala state syllabus. It has classes from LKG to 12th (+2) standard with Science(Biology), Commerce(Computer application), Humanities(Social Work).
The dress code is sky blue shirt and white pants

Notable alumni 
 C. Achutha Menon, 4th Chief Minister of Kerala State
 I M Vijayan, Ex-Indian football captain
 Puthezhath Raman Menon, Historian, Judge High Court Of Kerala
 P. Ramdas, First Neo-realistic Malayalam Movie Maker of "News Paper Boy"
 Cheril Krishna Menon, Entrepreneur, Philanthropist, Lawyer
 Sunil Sukhada, Indian film Actor
 Paul Poovathingal, CMI Priest
 Sukumaran, Indian film actor and producer
 Sadiq (Indian actor), Malayalam film industry

References

Christian schools in Kerala
Primary schools in Kerala
High schools and secondary schools in Kerala
Schools in Thrissur
Educational institutions established in 1883
1883 establishments in India